Jaya is a 2002 Indian Tamil-language film directed by the duo Ratnaraj-Kalanathan and starring Ramya Krishnan and Sherin.

Synopsis 
The movie is of murder mystery genre, where a college student gets murdered and one of her friends starts a hunt for the killers. Some of the shots for the movie were taken at the SRM College for Hotel Management, where Swetha Eswarawaka, a college student would be part of some competitions along with the lead cast of Ramya Krishnan and Sherin playing the role of college students.

Cast 

 Ramya Krishnan as Jaya
 Sherin Shringar as Priya
 Sriman as Balaji 
 Manorama
 Karunas as Micheal
 Ramesh Kanna as Ramesh Kanna
 Trilok as Saleem
 Swetha Eswarawaka
 Ambika
 Anu Mohan
 Thalaivasal Vijay
 FEFSI Vijayan
 Kumarimuthu
 Suryakanth
 Madhan Bob
 Vani Viswanath
 Baburaj

Soundtrack 

The music for this movie was composed by Bharani.

Production
A set resembling a college auditorium was erected at a cost of about Rs. 10 lakhs at a studio in Chennai. It was a college scene, celebrating the International Women's day, that was shot. The variety programme had a dance item by Jaya, Preithy and gang.

Reception
Thiraipadam wrote "poor execution results in an incoherent, slow movie that spends too little time on the main story, instead lurching around in several different, ineffective directions." The Hindu wrote "WHAT COULD have been a thrilling action-packed film ends a damp squib, thanks to insipid treatment".

References

2002 films
2000s Tamil-language films
Films directed by Senthilnathan